Okeover is a civil parish in the East Staffordshire district, in the county of Staffordshire, England. It has a small population and no central village. It lies close to the Derbyshire border.

The parish includes Okeover Hall a Grade II* listed country house that is not open to the public.

See also
Listed buildings in Okeover

References

Civil parishes in Staffordshire
Borough of East Staffordshire